Hidden Valley, California may refer to:

 Hidden Valley, El Dorado County, California
 Hidden Valley, Placer County, California
 Hidden Valley, Ventura County, California
 Hidden Valley Lake, Lake County, California
 Hidden Valley (Joshua Tree National Park)